Edward Pennant (died 1736) was Chief Justice of Jamaica.

References 

Chief justices of Jamaica
Year of birth missing
1736 deaths
18th-century Jamaican judges